Charles Georges "Carlos" Van den Driessche (31 August 1901 – 14 May 1972) was a Belgian ice hockey player and rower. As a hockey player he won a bronze medal at the 1924 European Championships and finished seventh and thirteenth at the 1924 and 1936 Winter Olympics, respectively.

As a rower he competed in the coxless pairs at the 1928 Summer Olympics, together with the fellow ice hockey player Philippe Van Volckxsom, but failed to reach the final. He won a bronze medal in the double sculls with Louis Strauwen at the 1929 European Rowing Championships.

Van den Driessche served as the president of the Royal Belgian Ice Hockey Federation in 1949–1951, 1953–1955 and 1960–1965.

See also
List of athletes who competed in both the Summer and Winter Olympic games

References

External links
 

1901 births
1972 deaths
20th-century Belgian people
Belgian male rowers
European Rowing Championships medalists
Ice hockey players at the 1924 Winter Olympics
Ice hockey players at the 1936 Winter Olympics
Olympic ice hockey players of Belgium
Olympic rowers of Belgium
Rowers at the 1928 Summer Olympics
Sportspeople from Brussels
Belgian ice hockey centres
Ice hockey coaches